The Ministry of Transport, Communication and Infrastructural Development is one of the government ministries of Zimbabwe, and is responsible for all the aspects related to the management of transport, communications, and meteorological and seismological infrastructure and services, within the country. From September 2018 until his death in January 2021, the minister was Joel Matiza. He was succeeded by Felix Mhona.

Subsidiary units 
The Ministry oversees the following parastatal organisms:
 National Railways of Zimbabwe
 Zimbabwe United Passenger Company (ZUPCO)
 Air Zimbabwe
 Zimbabwe National Roads Administration

Leaders 
Ministers
 2009 – 2014 Nicholas Goche
 2014 – 2015 Obert Mpofu
 2015 – 2018 Joram MacDonald Gumbo
 September 2018 – January 2021, Joel Matiza.
 from February 2021 – Felix Mhona.

Deputy ministers
 The deputy minister from 2009 was Tichaona Mudzingwa until his death in early April 2012.
 Deputy minister until May 2019 was Fortune Chasi,
 From February 2021 the deputy minister is Michael Madiro.

See also 
Politics of Zimbabwe
Transport in Zimbabwe

References 

Zimbabwe articles missing geocoordinate data
Government of Zimbabwe
Transport organisations based in Zimbabwe
Zimbabwe